Cymindis uyguricus is a species of ground beetle in the subfamily Harpalinae. It was described by B. Gueorguiev in 2000.

References

uyguricus
Beetles described in 2000